Lesley Grant-Adamson (born Lesley Heycock, 26 November 1942) is a British writer of mystery fiction and former journalist.

Life and career
A native of London, Grant-Adamson attended schools in that city and in Wales before embarking on a journalistic career in the early 1960s; she held a string of magazine and newspaper positions before becoming a feature writer with The Guardian, a job she left in 1980 to become a full-time freelance writer. Besides crime novels, she has written television scripts, poetry, magazine pieces, and short stories. Her novels feature Rain Morgan, a gossip columnist; private detective Laura Flynn; and American conman Jim Rush. She has written a number of non-series novels and several works of non-fiction as well. Her novel Patterns in the Dust was nominated for a John Creasey Award for Best First Novel.

Works
List taken from:

Rain Morgan novels
Patterns in the Dust (1985) (aka Death on Widow's Walk)
The Face of Death (1985)
Guilty Knowledge (1986)
Wild Justice (1987)
Curse the Darkness (1990)

Jim Rush novels
A Life of Adventure (1992)
Dangerous Games (1994)

Laura Flynn novel
Flynn (1991) (aka Too Many Questions)

Non-series novels
Threatening Eye (1988)
The Dangerous Edge (1993)
Wish You Were Here (1995)
Evil Acts (1996)
The Girl in the Case (1997)
Lipstick and Lies (1998)
Undertow (1999)

Non-fiction
A Season in Spain (1995) (with Andrew Grant-Adamson)
Writing Crime and Suspense Fiction (1996)
Teach Yourself Writing Crime Fiction (2003)

References

1942 births
Living people
Writers from London
British mystery writers
Women mystery writers
British women novelists
British women non-fiction writers
British women journalists
20th-century British journalists
20th-century British novelists
20th-century British non-fiction writers
20th-century British women writers
21st-century British non-fiction writers
21st-century British women writers
The Guardian journalists